2001 saw many sequels and prequels in video games, such as Capcom vs. SNK 2, Dead or Alive 3, Final Fantasy X, Gran Turismo 3: A-Spec, Grand Theft Auto III, Metal Gear Solid 2: Sons of Liberty, SSX Tricky, Super Smash Bros. Melee, Sonic Adventure 2, Tony Hawk's Pro Skater 3, and Virtua Fighter 4. New intellectual properties include Ace Attorney, Advance Wars, Animal Crossing, Burnout, Gothic, Black & White, Devil May Cry, Fatal Frame, Ghost Recon, Halo, Jak and Daxter, Max Payne, Oni, Onimusha: Warlords, Operation Flashpoint, Pikmin, Pro Evolution Soccer, Red Faction, Serious Sam, and Tropico.

Three major video game systems were released in 2001: the GameCube and the Game Boy Advance by Nintendo, and the Xbox by Microsoft. Sega, which had been a major competitor in the video game hardware market to this point, ended its involvement in the market after the failure of the Dreamcast. The year 2001 is remembered for its influence on the video game industry with the release of many games recognized as classics. Many video games released in 2001 defined or redefined their respective genres, including hack and slash game Devil May Cry, first-person shooter game Halo: Combat Evolved, and open world action-adventure game Grand Theft Auto III, which is regarded as an industry-defining work.

The year has been retrospectively considered one of the best and most important in video game history due to the release of numerous critically acclaimed, commercially successful and influential titles across all platforms and genres at the time. It was the peak year for the sixth generation of video game consoles, with the launch of the GameCube and Xbox, the latter focusing on online games (following SegaNet the previous year), and the Dreamcast's last year of production with Sega's exit from console manufacturing. Storytelling and mature themes also became a more mainstream trend. The year's best-selling video game worldwide was Pokémon Gold/Silver/Crystal, the fourth year in a row for the Pokémon series (since 1998). The year's most critically acclaimed titles were Gran Turismo 3 and Final Fantasy X in Japan, and Halo and Grand Theft Auto III in the West.

Top-rated games

Major awards

Critically acclaimed titles

Famitsu Platinum Hall of Fame 
In Japan, the following video game releases in 2001 entered Famitsu magazine's "Platinum Hall of Fame" for receiving Famitsu scores of at least 35 out of 40.

Metacritic and GameRankings 
In the West, Metacritic (MC) and GameRankings (GR) are aggregators of video game journalism reviews.

Financial performance

Best-selling home video games

Japan

United States

PAL regions

Highest-grossing arcade games in Japan

Major events

Events
 Academy of Interactive Arts & Sciences hosts the 4th Annual Interactive Achievement Awards; inducts John Carmack of id Software to the AIAS Hall of Fame.
British Academy of Film and Television Arts (BAFTA) hosts the 4th annual BAFTA Interactive Entertainment Awards for multimedia technologies; 15 of 21 awards go to video games.
 March 21 – The Game Boy Advance handheld is released by Nintendo. Also to back-up the GBA's identical graphics to the SNES an enhanced remake of Super Mario Bros. 2 was launched.
 May 17–19 – 7th annual Electronic Entertainment Expo (E3); the 4th annual Game Critics Awards For The Best Of E3
 June 23 – Sonic the Hedgehog celebrates its 10th anniversary.
 July – IEMA (Interactive Entertainment Merchants Association) hosts 2nd annual Executive Summit.
 Gama Network hosts the 3rd annual Independent Games Festival (IGF).
 Game Developers Conference hosts the 1st annual Game Developers Choice Awards.
 Spring – Reuters reports that the Dreamcast console has an estimated 800,000 online users playing its various online games already by midyear.
 Sony cooperates with AOL to incorporate Internet features with the PlayStation 2 console; which include a browser, email, and instant messaging capabilities.
 August – 2nd annual Dreamcast Championships (featuring the Crazy Taxi 2 video game).
 Nikkei News reports that the video game Phantasy Star Online (for Dreamcast) has had 300,000 worldwide users login already by midyear.
 September 14 – Nintendo releases the GameCube and its launch titles Luigi's Mansion and Wave Race: Blue Storm.
 November 15 – The Microsoft Xbox is introduced.
 November 18 – Nintendo releases the GameCube in North America with launch titles Luigi's Mansion and Wave Race: Blue Storm.
November 23 – Game Park releases the GP32 wireless-multiplayer multimedia handheld console in South Korea.
 December 31 – Jez San is awarded an OBE in the New Year Honours, becoming the first person awarded specifically for services to video games.
December – Panasonic releases the GameCube-based Q multimedia console.

Business
 Defunct companies: Bullfrog Productions, Indrema, Dynamix, Sanctuary Woods, SNK.
 After Dynamix (1984–2001) is closed as part of Sierra's restructuring under Vivendi Universal, several veterans of the studio found GarageGames.
Sega announces that it will no longer develop home consoles, to focus on game development. The Dreamcast is discontinued in May, but games including Sonic the Hedgehog will continue to be released.
Activision acquires Treyarch Invention LLC.
PCCW Japan (Pacific Century CyberWorks Japan Co., Ltd.) acquires VR1 Entertainment.
Long-time arcade developer Midway Games announces that it will no longer manufacture arcade games.
August – Loki Software declares Chapter 11 Bankruptcy over internal financial troubles, before going defunct next January. In response Michael Simms of the Tux Games retailer and former Loki game tester founds Linux Game Publishing alongside ex-Loki employee Mike Philips on October 15 to keep games coming to Linux.
October – Infogrames announces to revive Atari as a sub-brand of Infogrames. Splashdown, MX Rider and TransWorld Surf were the first 3 games to receive this treatment.

Lawsuits
Sega of America Inc. v. Kmart Corporation; Sega sues Kmart over an unpaid debt of over US$2 million
Uri Geller v. Nintendo; Geller sues Nintendo over his resemblance to a Pokémon character. The suit is dismissed.

Notable releases

Trends

Video game consoles
The dominant video game consoles in 2001 were:
Sony's PlayStation 2

Additionally, Nintendo released the Nintendo GameCube on September 14 in Japan (North America on November 18 and in Europe on May 3, 2002). Microsoft released the Xbox video game console in North America on November 15 (in Europe on March 14, 2002).

Handheld game systems
The dominant handheld systems in 2001 were:
Nintendo's Game Boy Color

Additionally, Nintendo released the Game Boy Advance (GBA) in Japan on March 21 (in North America on June 11 and Europe on June 22).

Births

Deaths
March 16 – Isao Okawa, 74, chairman of Sega.

See also
2001 in games

Notes

References

 
Video games by year